Kerala is an Indian state.

Kerala may also refer to:
Kerala Kingdom, a dynasty documented in Sanskrit epics
Kerala (moth), a genus of moths in the family Nolidae
Kerala Blasters FC, an Indian professional football club
F.C. Kerala, an Indian professional football club 
 Kerala, a village in Afghanistan and the site of the 1979 Kerala massacre
Kerala J. Snyder, American musicologist
"Kerala", a song by Bonobo from the 2017 album Migration

See also

 Karala